Broniszewo may refer to the following places:
Broniszewo, Koło County in Greater Poland Voivodeship (west-central Poland)
Broniszewo, Konin County in Greater Poland Voivodeship (west-central Poland)
Broniszewo, Podlaskie Voivodeship (north-east Poland)
Broniszewo, Września County in Greater Poland Voivodeship (west-central Poland)
Broniszewo, Warmian-Masurian Voivodeship (north Poland)